Arlo Victor Hullinger (August 29, 1921 – December 27, 2021) was an American politician in the state of Iowa.

Life and career
Hullinger was born in Decatur County, Iowa on August 29, 1921. He attended Iowa State University and was a farmer. He served in the Iowa House of Representatives from 1965 to 1981 as a Democrat. Hullinger died in Osceola, Iowa on December 27, 2021, at the age of 100.

References

1921 births
2021 deaths
American centenarians
Men centenarians
20th-century American politicians
Iowa State University alumni
Farmers from Iowa
Democratic Party members of the Iowa House of Representatives
People from Decatur County, Iowa